In phonetics, an r-colored or rhotic vowel (also called a retroflex vowel, vocalic r, or a rhotacized vowel) is a vowel that is modified in a way that results in a lowering in frequency of the third formant. R-colored vowels can be articulated in various ways: the tip or blade of the tongue may be turned up during at least part of the articulation of the vowel (a retroflex articulation) or the back of the tongue may be bunched. In addition, the vocal tract may often be constricted in the region of the epiglottis.

R-colored vowels are exceedingly rare, occurring in less than one percent of all languages. However, they occur in two of the most widely spoken languages: North American English and Mandarin Chinese. In North American English, they are found in words such as dollar, butter, third, color, and nurse. They also occur in Canadian French, some varieties of Portuguese, some Jutlandic dialects of Danish, as well as in a few indigenous languages of the Americas and of Asia, including Serrano and Yurok in the United States, Luobohe Miao in China, and Badaga in India.

Notation 
In the IPA, an r-colored vowel is indicated by a hook diacritic  placed to the right of the regular symbol for the vowel.

In 1976 the retroflex hook was dropped due to insufficient usage. The use of the superscript turned r is still commonly seen.

Examples

English 

R-colored vowels are found in most rhotic forms of English, including General American and Irish English. The r-colored vowels of General American can be written with "vowel-r" digraphs:
: hearse, assert, mirth (stressed, conventionally written ); standard, dinner, Lincolnshire (unstressed)
: start, car
: north, war

In words such as start, many speakers have r-coloring only in the coda of the vowel, rather than as a simultaneous articulation modifying the whole duration.

Singing 
In European classical singing, dropping or weakening of r-colored vowels has been nearly universal and is a standard part of classical vocal training. However, there have always been other singing styles in which r-colored vowels are given their full emphasis, including traditional Irish singing styles and those of many performers of country music. In certain particular cases, a vowel + /r/ is pronounced instead as two syllables: a non-rhotic vowel followed by a syllabic /r/.

Mandarin Chinese 

In Mandarin, the rhotacized ending of some words is the prime way by which to distinguish speakers of Standard Northern Mandarin (Beijing Mandarin) and Southwestern Mandarin from those of other forms of Mandarin in China. Mandarin speakers call this phenomenon erhua. In many words, the -r suffix is added to indicate some meaning changes. If the word ends in a velar nasal (ng), the final consonant is lost and the vowel becomes nasalized. Major cities that have this form of rhotacized ending include Beijing, Tianjin, Tangshan, Shenyang, Changchun, Jilin, Harbin, and Qiqihar. This erhua has since spread to other provincial capitals not home to Standard Mandarin, such as Shijiazhuang, Jinan, Xian, Chongqing, and Chengdu.

In rhotic accents of Standard Mandarin, such as those from Beijing, Tianjin, most of the Hebei province (e.g. Tangshan, Baoding, Chengde), eastern Inner Mongolia (e.g. Chifeng, Hailar), and in the Northeast, vocalic r occurs as a diminutive marker of nouns and the perfective aspect particle. This also occurs in the middle syllables of compound words consisting of three or more syllables. For example, the name of the famous restaurant Go Believe in Tianjin is pronounced as 'Gourbli' (Gǒu(r)bùlǐ → Gǒurblǐ). The name of the street Dazhalan in Beijing is pronounced as 'Da-shi-lar' (Dàshànlàn(r) → Dàshílàr).

Quebec French 
In Quebec French, the vowel  is generally pronounced  and the r-colored vowels are also pronounced in loan words. For example, the word hamburger can be pronounced , the word soccer can be pronounced  etc.

Other examples 
In the 1930s the Dravidian language Badaga had two degrees of rhoticity among all five of its vowels, but few speakers maintain the distinction today, and then only in one or two vowels. An example is non-rhotic  "mouth", slightly rhotacized ("half retroflexed")  "bangle", and fully rhotacized ("fully retroflexed")  "crop".

The Algic language Yurok illustrated rhotic vowel harmony. The non-high vowels ,  and  could become  in a word that has . For example, the root  'three' became  in the word  'three (animals or birds)'.

Luobohe Miao also contains .

See also 
Linking R
Rhotic consonant (r-like)
Syllabic consonant

References

Further reading
 
 
 
 

Vowels
Phonology
Phonetics